The following outline is provided as an overview of and topical guide to England:

England is a country that is part of the United Kingdom. Its 55,268,100 inhabitants account for more than 84% of the total UK population, while its mainland territory occupies most of the southern two-thirds of the island of Great Britain. England is bordered by Scotland to the north, Wales to the west and the North Sea, Irish Sea, Celtic Sea, Bristol Channel and English Channel. The capital is London, the largest metropolitan area in Great Britain, and the largest urban zone in the European Union by many measures.

General reference 
 Pronunciation: 
 Etymology of "England"
 Common English country name(s): England
 Official English country name(s): England
 Common endonym(s): List of countries and capitals in native languages
 Official endonym(s): List of official endonyms of present-day nations and states
 Adjectival(s): English
 Demonym(s): English

Geography of England 

Geography of England
 England is: a constituent country of the United Kingdom. See Countries of the United Kingdom.
 Location
 Atlantic Ocean
 Northern Hemisphere, on the Prime Meridian
 Eurasia (but not on the mainland)
 Europe
 Northern Europe and Western Europe
 British Isles
 Great Britain (the largest island of the British isles)
 Extreme points of England
 Demography of England:
 Area of England:
 Places in England
 Atlas of England

Environment of England 
 Climate of England
 Geology of England
 National parks of England and Wales
 Fauna of England

Natural geographic features of England 

 Estuaries in England
 Islands of England
 Lakes of England
 Mountains and hills of England
 Rivers of England
 Waterfalls of England

Regions of England 
 North East
North East
North of Tyne
Tees Valley
 North West
Greater Manchester
Liverpool City Region
 Yorkshire and The Humber
Sheffield City Region
Leeds City Region
 East Midlands
 West Midlands
West Midlands
 East of England
Cambridgeshire and Peterborough
 London
 South East
 South West
West of England

Administrative divisions of England 
Administrative divisions of England
 Regions of England
 Sub-Regions of England
 Districts of England
 Civil parishes in England
 Municipalities of England
 Unitary authorities of England

Counties of England 
Counties of England
 Metropolitan and non-metropolitan counties of England

Districts of England 
Districts of England

Civil parishes of England 
 List of civil parishes in England

Unitary authorities of England 

Unitary authorities of England

Municipalities of England 

Municipalities of England
 Capital of England: Capital of England
 Cities in England
 Towns in England

Demography of England 
Demography of England

Government and politics of England 
Politics of England
 Form of government: none.
 England is under the full jurisdiction of the Parliament of the United Kingdom of Great Britain and Northern Ireland and the UK government.
 England is the only country of the UK that doesn't have its own (devolved) government.
 Capital of England: London
 Taxation in England
 West Lothian question

Law and order in England 
English law
 Capital punishment in the United Kingdom: none
 Courts of England and Wales
 List of courts in England and Wales
 Human rights in England: same as for the UK
 Freedom of religion in England
 LGBT rights in England: largely same as for other parts of UK
 Law enforcement in England
 Prison population of England and Wales
 Rights of way in England and Wales

Military of England 

Military of England
 England does not have its own military. See British Armed Forces.
 Military history of England

Local government of England 

Local government in England

History of England 

History of England

History of England by period 

 Prehistoric Britain
 Roman Britain
 Anglo-Saxon England
 Kingdom of England
 List of years in the Kingdom of England
 Norman conquest of England
 Anglo-Norman England
 House of Plantagenet
 House of Lancaster
 House of York
 House of Tudor
 House of Stuart
 Stuart Restoration
 The Protectorate
 Commonwealth of England
 Glorious Revolution
 Kingdom of Great Britain
 United Kingdom of Great Britain and Ireland
 United Kingdom of Great Britain and Northern Ireland

History of England, by region

History of cities of England 

 History of Birmingham
 History of Bristol
 History of Chester
 History of Coventry
 History of Durham
 History of Leeds
 History of Liverpool
 History of London
 History of Manchester
 History of Margate
 History of Newcastle upon Tyne
 History of Nottingham
 History of Sheffield
 History of York

History of counties of England 
 History of Bedfordshire
 History of Berkshire
 History of Buckinghamshire
 History of Cambridgeshire
 History of Cheshire
 History of Cleveland
 History of Cornwall
 History of Cumberland
 History of Cumbria
 History of Derbyshire
 History of Devon
 History of Dorset
 History of Durham
 History of East Suffolk
 History of East Sussex
 History of Essex
 History of Gloucestershire
 History of Greater London
 History of Greater Manchester
 History of Hampshire
 History of Hereford and Worcester
 History of Herefordshire
 History of Hertfordshire
 History of Humberside
 History of Huntingdon and Peterborough
 History of Huntingdonshire
 History of the Isle of Ely
 History of the Isle of Wight
 History of Kent
 History of Lancashire
 History of Leicestershire
 History of Lincolnshire
 History of Merseyside
 History of Middlesex
 History of Norfolk
 History of Northamptonshire
 History of Northumberland
 History of North Humberside
 History of North Yorkshire
 History of Nottinghamshire
 History of Oxfordshire
 History of Soke of Peterborough
 History of Rutland
 History of Shropshire
 History of Somerset
 History of South Humberside
 History of South Yorkshire
 History of Staffordshire
 History of Suffolk
 History of Surrey
 History of Sussex
 History of Tyne and Wear
 History of Warwickshire
 History of West Midlands
 History of Westmorland
 History of West Suffolk
 History of West Sussex
 History of West Yorkshire
 History of Wiltshire
 History of Worcestershire
 History of Yorkshire
 History of Yorkshire, East Riding
 History of Yorkshire, North Riding
 History of Yorkshire, West Riding

History of England, by subject 

 British Invasion
 History of the Church of England
 History of education in England
 History of the Jews in England
 History of local government in England
 Military history of England
 Battles between Scotland and England
 Wars involving England and France
 Parliament of England
 Peerage of England

Culture of England 
Culture of England
 Architecture of England
 Architecture of the medieval cathedrals of England
 Cathedrals in England
 Castles in England
 Hill forts in England
 Historic houses in England
 National Trust properties in England
 Cuisine of England
 Cultural icons of England
 Ethnic minorities in England
 Gardens in England
 Festivals in England
 British humour
 English inventions and discoveries
 Languages of England
 Marriage in England
 Civil partnership in England
 Media in England
 Museums in England
 National symbols of England
 Coat of arms of England
 Flag of England
 National anthem of England
 People of England
 Prostitution in the United Kingdom
 Public holidays in England
 Records of England
 Religion in England
 Buddhism in England
 Christianity in England
 Church of England
 Roman Catholicism in England and Wales
 Hinduism in England
 Islam in England
 Judaism in England
 Sikhism in England
 World Heritage Sites in England

Art of England 

Art in England
 Cinema of England
 Comedy in England
 Literature of England
 Music of England
 Bands from England
 Folk music of England
 Television in England
 Theatre in England
 Entertainment venues in London

Sport in England 

Sports in England
 Chess in England
 English Chess Federation
 Cricket in England
 England cricket team
 Football in England
 England national football team
 The Football Association
 FA Cup
 The Football League
 Premier League
 National sports teams of England
 Olympics and England - England does not compete at the Olympic Games, English athletes compete as part of the Great Britain team instead.
 Rugby in England
 Rugby league in England
 Rugby union in England
 Stadiums in England

Economy and infrastructure of England 
Economy of England
 Economic rank (by nominal GDP):
 Agriculture in England
 Banking in England
 Bank of England (central bank of the UK)
 Communications in England
 Internet in England
 Companies of England
 List of award-winning pubs in London
 List of companies based in London
 List of pubs in London
 List of restaurants in London
 Currency of the United Kingdom: Pound Sterling
 Economic history of England
 Energy in England
 List of power stations in England
 Oil industry in England
 Fire service in the United Kingdom#England
 Health care in England
 History of the National Health Service
 List of hospitals in England
 Mining in England
 Tourism in England
 Transport in England
 List of airports in England
 List of ports in England
 Rail transport in England
 Roads in England
 National Cycle Network
 Water supply and sanitation in England

Education in England 

Education in England
 General Teaching Council for England
 National Curriculum for England

Types of schools in England 
 Grammar schools in the United Kingdom
 Private school
 Preparatory school

Specific schools in England 
 Public schools in England
 Grammar schools in England
 Middle schools in England
 Universities

Notes

See also 

 England
 
 
 
 
 List of basic geography topics
 List of international rankings
 Outline of Northern Ireland
 Outline of Scotland
 Outline of the United Kingdom
 Outline of Wales

References

External links 

 
 Official website of the United Kingdom Government
 Office for National Statistics
 English Heritage  – national body protecting and promoting English history and heritage.
 English Nature  – wildlife and the natural world of England.
 England-related pages from the BBC
 
 Enjoy England  – The official website of the English Tourist Board
 Enjoy England's Travel Blog  – Discover England's best hidden gems
 UK & Ireland Genealogy

England